Albert Gallatin Wetherby (1833 in Pittsburgh – 1902 in Magnetic City, Mitchell County, North Carolina) was an American malacologist and mineralogist.

He was from 1870 Professor of Natural History at Cincinnati University. Later he became a businessman

Works
 with Harper, G.W. 1876. Catalogue of the land and fresh water Mollusca, found in the immediate vicinity of Cincinnati, O.James Barclay Printing House, Cincinnati, Ohio. 1:1–5.
 1881. On the geographical distribution of certain fresh-water mollusks of North America, and the probable causes of their variation. Journal of the Cincinnati Society of Natural History 3:317–324; 4(2):156–166.
1883. [Relation of mollusks to their shells]. Journal of the Cincinnati Society of Natural History 6(1):2.

References
Abbott, R.T., and M.E. Young (eds.). 1973. American Malacologists: A national register of professional and amateur malacologists and private shell collectors and biographies of early American mollusk workers born between 1618 and 1900 Falls Church, Virginia. Consolidated/Drake Press, Philadelphia. 494 pp.
Obit. Albert G. Wetherby. Nautilus 16 (1):10–12 + portrait.

External links
 Albert Gallatin Wetherby

American malacologists